Samuel David Bundy (July 19, 1906 – January 19, 1983) was an American educator and politician.

Born in Farmville, North Carolina, Bundy graduated from Farmville High School in 1923. In 1927, Bundy received his bachelor's degree from Duke University and his master's degree, in 1948, from East Carolina University. Bundy was a school principal in several schools. Bundy served in the North Carolina House of Representatives from 1971 until his death in 1982. He was a Democrat. Bundy died in a hospital in Raleigh, North Carolina after suffering a heart attack at a hotel restaurant.

Notes

1906 births
1983 deaths
People from Farmville, North Carolina
Duke University alumni
East Carolina University alumni
Educators from North Carolina
Democratic Party members of the North Carolina House of Representatives
20th-century American politicians